Kremlin.ru is the official website of the President of the Russian Federation. It was launched in January 2000. Content of the website is licensed under a Creative Commons Attribution 4.0 International license.

Content
The website publishes all content issued by the Presidential Press Service in Russian and English, especially transcripts of Russian Presidential speeches (e.g. Valdai speech of Vladimir Putin).

History
The web site of the President of Russia was launched in January 2000, and was radically reworked during 2001-2002, which resulted in a second version being released on June 20, 2002, followed by an English version a year later. On January 19, 2004, a children's version was released and  called the President of Russia - to citizens of school age."

A third version was released on June 20, 2004,  only three months after the Russian Presidential Election.

A fourth version was released on August 31, 2009, with an English version on June 3, 2010.

The fifth, current version was released on April 8, 2015.

On May 11, 2010, the site became one of the first three sites in the domain .rf.

On July 20, 2012, the site was target of a DDoS attack, and in 2013, the site was blocked in Turkmenistan.

During February 24, 2022, the site was shortly intermittently unavailable  due to DDoS attacks, as a reaction to the Russian military incursions into Ukraine. Days after the attack, the website returned back online and is currently active.

References

External links
 kremlin.ru 
 eng.kremlin.ru 

Internet properties established in 2000
Internet in Russia
Presidency of Russia
Creative Commons-licensed websites